Tyron North Carrier (born December 19, 1987) is an American football coach who was formerly a wide receiver for the Montreal Alouettes of the Canadian Football League. He played college football at Houston.

College career 
Carrier finished his college career with 320 receptions, which is the second most in NCAA Division I/FBS history. In his career, Carrier returned seven kickoffs for touchdowns, an NCAA FBS record that he shares with Clemson's C. J. Spiller, San Diego State's Rashaad Penny, and Memphis's Tony Pollard.  His 7,490 career all-purpose yards ranks sixth all-time.  Carrier also holds the FBS record of 53 consecutive games with at least two receptions.

Coaching career 
In 2016, Carrier was hired as the wide receivers coach for the West Virginia Mountaineers.

In 2019, Carrier joined Dana Holgorsen at the University of Houston as assistant head coach and wide receivers coach.He and the school parted ways in May of 2021.

After spending the 2021 season out of coaching, Carrier was hired in March of 2022 as the wide receivers coach at Texas A&M-Commerce.

See also
2008 Houston Cougars football team
2009 Houston Cougars football team
2010 Houston Cougars football team
2011 Houston Cougars football team

References

External links
Just Sports Stats
Montreal Alouettes bio
Houston Cougars bio

1987 births
Living people
Sportspeople from Houston
Players of American football from Houston
Players of Canadian football from Houston
American football wide receivers
American football return specialists
Canadian football wide receivers
Canadian football return specialists
Houston Cougars football players
Montreal Alouettes players
West Virginia Mountaineers football coaches
Houston Cougars football coaches